Daniel Quinn Karaty (born October 1, 1976) is an American TV personality, actor, producer, dancer and choreographer.  He has performed with and/or created routines for pop superstars such as Jessica Simpson, Britney Spears, Kylie Minogue and *NSYNC.  Karaty is also well known as a judge and choreographer on several versions of the global dance competition program So You Think You Can Dance, including the American, Australian, Canadian versions and as a permanent member of the judge's panel for the Dutch-Belgian version since its first season. In addition, Karaty starred in "Soof," The Netherlands' highest-grossing film in 2013.  He appears as a judge or mentor on X Factor, Everybody Dance Now, My Name Is Michael, Holland's Got Talent, So You Think You Can Dance: The Next Generation, Belgium's Got Talent and The Ultimate Dance Battle, the last of which he created and on which he serves as executive producer.  Previously, Karaty served in the capacity of a performance stager and choreographer on America's Got Talent.

Personal
Both of Karaty's parents were performers on Broadway.  He attended New York University, graduating in 1999 with a B.A. journalism.

This is from his official website:

Dan Karaty is one of the hottest entertainers working today. In addition to choreographing films like Disney's "Prom," “Music and Lyrics” with Drew Barrymore, and “Did You Hear About The Morgans” with Hugh Grant and Sarah Jessica Parker, Karaty currently serves as a Judge around the world on ratings hits "So You Think You Can Dance," "X Factor," "Everybody Dance Now," "My Name Is...," "Holland’s Got Talent," "The Ultimate Dance Battle" and "Belgium's Got Talent."  Karaty's incredible choreography and thought-provoking critiques have made him a worldwide fan favorite.

Karaty was born just outside New York City to Broadway veterans Tom and Jane Karaty so it's no surprise dance is a huge part of his life. Although his Broadway roots remain a tremendous influence in his life, he chose sneakers and hip-hop over Broadway ballads!  Karaty's unique path allowed him to infuse his work with the spirit of classic Broadway inspirations like Gene Kelly, Fred Astaire and trailblazers in the hip-hop and pop culture like Michael Jackson.

During college at NYU, Karaty spent his “free” time teaching at the popular Tremaine Dance Conventions where he met friend and collaborator Wade Robson. During his junior year, Karaty made his Broadway debut in the smash hit “Footloose” and soon thereafter began dancing with Britney Spears on the MTV Video Music Awards and The Billboard Awards.

After graduating from NYU with a B.A. in Journalism, Karaty decided it was time to make the move to Hollywood where he and Robson continued to collaborate. Their rise was fast and furious and included high-profile projects like Britney Spears’ first Pepsi commercial and the *NSYNC World Tour.

Karaty then branched out on his own, choreographing Jessica Simpson's “Irresistible” and “Little Bit” music videos and serving as Artistic Director for her 2001 World Tour. He also worked with Kylie Minogue on many of her television appearances, as well as a long list of cutting-edge artists like Justin Timberlake and Usher.  Although he quickly became known for his work in the pop music genre, Karaty broadened his reach by choreographing ground-breaking commercials for iPod, Best Buy, Mattel, Miller and many more.

Karaty's experience, combined with his gift for comedy, allowed him to move into the film industry where he choreographed “Music and Lyrics,”  “Malibu’s Most Wanted,” "Did You Hear About The Morgans” and Disney's 2011 release, "Prom."

Beyond his role as a Judge on T.V. series around the world, Karaty has his sights set on producing and directing films, television and theater. He is currently in development on several film and television projects and even a Broadway production of his own!"

With his wife Natasha, Karaty has two children, a daughter named Quinn, and a son named Daniel.

Career
He made his own Broadway debut in the musical Footloose during his junior year in college.  During his senior year, he began dancing with Britney Spears.

Karaty has appeared on the MTV Awards and the Billboard Awards, and was the sole choreographer for the 2002 American Dance Music Awards.

Karaty is currently appearing as a judge on the Canadian and Dutch/Belgian versions of So You Think You Can Dance.

Karaty also appeared on Bravo's fall 2009 series Launch My Line, a reality show that pairs professionals of a specific industry—in Karaty's case, dance/choreography—and experts in fashion design in order to create an apparel line.

 Holland's Got Talent (The Netherlands)
 Belgium's Got Talent (Belgium)
 Everybody Dance Now (The Netherlands)
 My Name Is Michael   (The Netherlands and Belgium)
 So You Think You Can Dance (Belgium and The Netherlands)
 So You Think You Can Dance (USA)
 So You Think You Can Dance (Canada)
 So You Think You Can Dance: The Next Generation (Belgium and The Netherlands)
 The Ultimate Dance Battle (Belgium and The Netherlands)
 "X Factor"

Select Credits
 So You Think You Can Dance: Judge/Choreographer – Canada, Netherlands, Belgium, Australia, US
 America's Got Talent: Performance Stager/Choreographer
 Holland's Got Talent: Judge
 Everybody Dance Now: Judge
 X Factor: Judge – Holland
 Soof - Actor ("Jim") - Millstreet Films
 Prom - Disney
 Did You Hear About The Morgans – Hugh Grant and Sarah Jessica Parker
 Music and Lyrics – Hugh Grant and Drew Barrymore
 My Name Is Michael: Judge
 Better Off Ted: ABC
 The Ellen DeGeneres Show: Multiple Episodes
 Jessica Simpson: “Irresistible” “Little Bit”, World Tour – Artistic Director
 IPOD: “Jazz” – Dir. Mark Romanek
 Best Buy: Geek Squad Campaign – Dir. Limore Shur
 NSYNC: 2000 VMA's, “Pop Odyssey” World Tour – Co-Director/Choreographer
 Britney Spears: 2000 VMA's, Pepsi with Britney, “Oops I Did It Again” Tour
 Cascada – “Evacuate The Dance Floor”
 Deal or No Deal: NBC
 Malibu's Most Wanted: Jamie Kennedy and Taye Diggs
 Kylie Minogue: VMA's Europe, Multiple Television Projects
 American Dance Music Awards: feat. Diddy, Dirty Vegas, Paul Oakenfold
 The Jamie Kennedy Experiment: WB – Multiple Episodes
 The Mandy Moore Show: MTV
 The Ultimate Dance Battle

References

External links
Official site
Biography at the Broadway Dance Center

1976 births
Living people
American choreographers
American television personalities
Male television personalities
So You Think You Can Dance choreographers
People from Wyckoff, New Jersey
So You Think You Can Dance (Belgian and Dutch TV series)